Steven Nelson (born January 22, 1993) is an American football cornerback for the Houston Texans of the National Football League (NFL). He played college football at Oregon State, and was drafted in the third round of the 2015 NFL Draft by the Kansas City Chiefs. He has also played for the Pittsburgh Steelers and Philadelphia Eagles.

Early years
Nelson attended Northside High School in Warner Robins, Georgia. As a senior, he had seven interceptions on defense and seven punt return touchdowns. Also a track star at Warner Robins, Nelson had a best of 11.15 seconds in the 100 meters and was part of the 4x100 relay team that finished in first place in the county.

College career
Nelson attended the College of the Sequoias for two years, where he had 71 tackles and six interceptions. He was originally going to transfer to the University of Georgia but changed to Oregon State University. Nelson entered his first season at Oregon State as the nickel corner, eventually becoming a starter and starting the final nine games. For the season he had 62 tackles and six interceptions. As a senior in 2014, Nelson recorded 60 tackles and two interceptions.

Professional career
On November 30, 2014, it was announced that Nelson had accepted his invitation to play in the 2015 Senior Bowl. On January 24, 2015, Nelson appeared in the 2015 Senior Bowl and recorded four tackles as part of Tennessee Titans' head coach Ken Whisenhunt's North team that defeated the South 34–13. Nelson attended the NFL Scouting Combine in Indianapolis and completed all of the combine and positional drills. 

On March 13, 2015, Nelson participated at Oregon State's pro day and chose to run the 40-yard dash (4.46s), 20-yard dash (2.57s), 10-yard dash (1.57s), and also positional and pass coverage drills. He attended pre-draft visits with the Pittsburgh Steelers and Detroit Lions and was considered one of the most underrated prospects in the upcoming draft. At the conclusion of the pre-draft process, Nelson was projected to be a third round pick by NFL draft experts and scouts. He was ranked as the 12th-best cornerback prospect in the draft by DraftScout.com and was ranked as the 13th-best cornerback by USA Today.

Kansas City Chiefs

2015

The Kansas City Chiefs selected Nelson in the third round (98th overall) of the 2015 NFL Draft. Nelson was the 14th cornerback drafted overall and was the second cornerback drafted by the Chiefs in 2015.

On May 15, 2015, the Kansas City Chiefs signed Nelson to a four-year, $2.91 million contract that includes a signing bonus of $581,952.

Throughout training camp, Nelson competed for a backup cornerback spot against Jamell Fleming and Marcus Cooper. Head coach Andy Reid named Nelson the sixth cornerback on the Chiefs' depth chart to begin the regular season, behind Sean Smith, Phillip Gaines, Marcus Peters, Jamell Fleming, and Marcus Cooper.

Nelson was inactive as a healthy scratch for the first four regular season games of his rookie season (Weeks 1–4). On October 11, 2015, Nelson made his professional regular season debut in the Kansas City Chiefs' 36–21 loss at the Cincinnati Bengals in Week 4. In Week 12, he collected a season-high three solo tackles in the Chiefs' 30–22 victory against the Buffalo Bills. Nelson finished his rookie season with eight solo tackles in 12 games, appearing primarily on special teams.

The Kansas City Chiefs finished second in the AFC West with an 11–5 record and earned a playoff berth as a wildcard. On January 9, 2016, Nelson appeared in his first career playoff game and broke up a pass during a 30-0 victory at the Houston Texans in the AFC Wildcard Game. The following week, the Chiefs were eliminated from the playoffs after a 27-20 loss at the New England Patriots in the AFC Divisional Round.

2016
Throughout training camp, Nelson competed to be a starting cornerback after Sean Smith departed for the Oakland Raiders in free agency. Nelson competed against Jamell Fleming, Phillip Gaines, and rookie KeiVarae Russell. Head coach Andy Reid named Nelson a starting cornerback to start the regular season, alongside Marcus Peters.

He started in the Kansas City Chiefs' season-opener against the San Diego Chargers and collected a season-high nine solo tackles in their 33–27 victory. In Week 9, he recorded two combined tackles and made a season-high three pass deflections during a 19–14 victory against the Jacksonville Jaguars. Nelson was inactive for the Chiefs' Week 12 victory at the Denver Broncos due to a neck injury. He finished the season with 65 combined tackles (59 solo) and 16 pass deflections in 15 games and 15 starts.

The Kansas City Chiefs finished first in the AFC West with a 12–4 record and earned a first round bye. On January 25, 2017, Nelson started his first career playoff game in the AFC Divisional Round against the Pittsburgh Steelers and made five combined tackles as the Chiefs lost 18–16.

2017
Nelson entered training camp slated as a starting cornerback but saw competition for the role from Phillip Gaines. On September 3, 2017, the Kansas City Chiefs placed Nelson on injured reserve/designated to return in order for him to undergo core muscle surgery. On October 30, 2017, the Kansas City Chiefs activated Nelson off injured reserve for the team's Week 8 matchup against the Broncos. He returned to his starting role in Week 9 and was named the starting cornerback, along with Marcus Peters, for the remainder of the season. In Week 13, he collected a season-high nine combined tackles during a 38–31 loss at the New York Jets. He finished the 2017 season with 41 combined tackles (33 solo) and four pass deflections in nine games and seven starts. He received an overall grade of 76.8 from Pro Football Focus in 2017.

The Kansas City Chiefs finished first in the AFC West with a 10–6 record, but were eliminated from the playoffs after a 22–21 upset loss to the Tennessee Titans in the AFC wild card game. He finished the game with three combined tackles and a pass deflection.

2018
Nelson entered training camp slated as the No. 1 starting cornerback on the Chiefs' depth chart after the team traded Marcus Peters to the Los Angeles Rams. Head coach Andy Reid named Nelson and Kendall Fuller the starting cornerback tandem to begin the regular season in 2018.

He started in the Kansas City Chiefs' season-opener at the Los Angeles Chargers and collected eight combined tackles and broke up a pass in their 38–28 victory. On October 7, 2018, Nelson recorded three combined tackles, deflected two passes, and made his first career interception during a 30–14 victory against the Jacksonville Jaguars in Week 5. He made his first career interception off a pass attempt by quarterback Blake Bortles after Bortles' pass ricocheted off the helmet of a Jaguars' offensive lineman and was caught by Nelson in the end zone with less than 12 seconds remaining in the second quarter. He started all 16 games in 2018, recording 68 combined tackles, 15 passes defensed, and four interceptions.

Pittsburgh Steelers

2019
On March 14, 2019, the Pittsburgh Steelers signed Nelson to a three-year, $25.5 million contract that includes a signing bonus of $7.50 million. Head coach Mike Tomlin named Nelson and Joe Haden the starting cornerback duo to begin the regular season.

Nelson made his debut with the Steelers in Week 1 against the New England Patriots. In the game, Nelson made 3 tackles in the 33-3 loss. Nelson was inactive for the Steelers’ Week 6 victory at the Los Angeles Chargers due to a groin injury. In Week 8 against the Miami Dolphins, Nelson recovered a fumble forced by teammate Mike Hilton on Mark Walton in the 27-14 win. In Week 15 against the Buffalo Bills on Sunday Night Football, Nelson intercepted a pass thrown by Josh Allen and returned it for 33 yards as the Steelers lost 17–10.

2020
In Week 5 against the Philadelphia Eagles, Nelson recorded his first two interceptions off of passes thrown by Carson Wentz during the 38–29 win.

On March 23, 2021, the Steelers, at Nelson's request, terminated his contract.

Philadelphia Eagles 
On July 25, 2021, Nelson agreed to terms on a one-year contract with the Philadelphia Eagles. He started 16 games in 2021, recording 50 tackles, seven passes defensed, and one interception.

Houston Texans
On April 14, 2022, Nelson signed with the Houston Texans.

NFL career statistics

References

External links
 Oregon State Beavers bio
 Kansas City Chiefs bio

1993 births
Living people
American football cornerbacks
College of the Sequoias Giants football players
Houston Texans players
Kansas City Chiefs players
Oregon State Beavers football players
People from Warner Robins, Georgia
Philadelphia Eagles players
Pittsburgh Steelers players
Players of American football from Georgia (U.S. state)